Allianz Technology Trust is a large British investment trust dedicated to investments in technology companies. Established in 1995, the company is a constituent of the FTSE 250 Index, an index of the larger companies on the London Stock Exchange.

The chairman is Robert Jeens. Allianz Technology Trust was named Best Technology Trust by ADVFN for 2020. It is managed by Allianz Global Investors, owned by the global financial services group Allianz.

References

External links
 Official site

Financial services companies established in 1995
Investment trusts of the United Kingdom